Jumping All Over the World is the thirteenth studio album by German Techno group Scooter, released in Germany in 2007. Five singles have been released from it: "The Question Is What Is the Question?", "And No Matches", "Jumping All Over the World", a remix of "I'm Lonely" and a new version of "Jump That Rock!" titled "Jump That Rock (Whatever You Want)" recorded with British rock group Status Quo. The album's original artwork features people performing Jumpstyle.

A revised version of the album was released in the UK in 2008, their first album release in that country since The Stadium Techno Experience in 2003. It entered the UK Albums Chart at number 1, replacing Madonna's album Hard Candy, and is their highest ever charting release there. On 30 May 2008 it was certified Gold by the BPI and on 22 August 2008 it was certified Platinum.

On 3 October 2008 a new version of Jumping All Over the World was released, titled Jumping All Over the World - Whatever You Want.

Track listing
 The Definition - 1:25
 Jumping All Over the World - 3:48
 The Question Is What Is the Question? - 3:46
 Enola Gay - 3:59
 Neverending Story - 3:52
 And No Matches - 3:31
 Cambodia - 5:23
 I'm Lonely - 4:02
 Whistling Dave - 3:39
 Marian (Version) - 4:55
 Lighten Up the Sky - 6:19
 The Hardcore Massive - 4:25
 Jump That Rock! [UK only]- 3:50
 The Greatest Difficulty - 0:20

The UK edition of the album features one extra track, "Jump That Rock!", the radio edit of "I'm Lonely" replacing the original, and a new version of "Lighten Up the Sky".

Limited edition
A limited edition version of the album comes with a second CD which includes Scooter's 20 German top ten hits so far. This 2 CD version was released as standard in the UK, but with an alternative first track: for DJS mixing

 "Apache Rocks the Bottom" (UK Only)
 "One (Always Hardcore)"
 "Shake That!"
 "Jigga Jigga!"
 "Maria (I Like It Loud)"
 "The Night"
 "Weekend!"
 "Nessaja"
 "The Logical Song"
 "Posse (I Need You on the Floor)"
 "Faster Harder Scooter"
 "How Much Is the Fish?"
 "Fire"
 "I'm Raving"
 "Rebel Yell"
 "Back in the U.K."
 "Endless Summer"
 "Friends"
 "Move Your Ass!"
 "Hyper Hyper"

bonus track 
The Question Is What Is the Question?" [Headhunters Remix]

Jumping All Over the World – Whatever You Want
An updated version of the album was released in October 2008, titled Jumping All Over the World – Whatever You Want. The Limited Deluxe Edition contains two CDs and two DVDs, the Premium edition contains the two CDs and the live DVD, whilst the Standard Edition consists of only the two CDs. In the UK a 'Platinum Edition' was released on November 17 featuring the original album plus Jump That Rock (Whatever You Want), the live DVD and the missing tracks from the greatest hits CD from the first release of the album.

CD 1: Jumping All Over the World – Whatever You Want
 The Definition
 Jumping All Over the World
 The Question Is What Is the Question?
 Enola Gay
 Neverending Story
 And No Matches
 Cambodia
 I'm Lonely (Single Version)
 Whistling Dave
 Marian (Version)
 Lighten Up the Sky (New Version)
 The Hardcore Massive
 The Greatest Difficulty
 Bloodhound Gang - Weekend! (Bonus: Hands on Scooter)
 K.I.Z - Was kostet der Fisch? (How Much Is the Fish?) (Bonus: Hands On Scooter)
 Sido - Beweg dein Arsch (Move Your Ass) (Bonus: Hands On Scooter)
 Modeselektor featuring Otto von Schirach - Hyper Hyper (Bonus: Hands On Scooter)
 Jan Delay & Moonbootica - I’m Raving (Bonus: Hands On Scooter)
 Andreas Dorau - Aiii Shot the DJ (Bonus: Hands On Scooter)
 Klostertaler - Friends (Bonus: Hands On Scooter)

CD 2: The Ultimate Singles Collection
 Scooter vs. Status Quo - Jump That Rock (Whatever You Want)
 One (Always Hardcore)
 Shake That!
 Jigga Jigga!
 Maria (I Like It Loud)
 The Night
 Weekend!
 Nessaja
 The Logical Song
 Posse (I Need You on the Floor)
 Faster Harder Scooter
 How Much Is the Fish?
 Fire
 I'm Raving
 Rebel Yell
 Back in the UK
 Endless Summer
 Friends
 Move Your Ass!
 Hyper Hyper
 Sheffield Jumpers - Jump with Me (Bonus Track)

DVD 1: Live in Berlin 20081
 Intro
 Call Me Mañana
 Jumping All Over The World
 The Question Is What Is The Question?
 I'm Raving
 Weekend!
 And No Matches
 Jump That Rock
 No Fate
 Jumpstyle Medley feat Sheffield Jumpers
 Fuck The Millennium
 Aiii Shot The DJ
 Nessaja
 How Much Is The Fish?
 I'm Lonely
 One (Always Hardcore)
 Jigga Jigga!
 Maria (I Like It Loud)
 Hyper Hyper!

Notes
1 Live concert at Zitadelle Spandau, Berlin filmed 1 August 2008 and previously broadcast on VIVA.
DVD 2: The Complete Video Collection
 Jump That Rock (Whatever You Want)
 I'm Lonely
 Jumping All Over the World
 And No Matches
 The Question Is What Is the Question?
 Lass Uns Tanzen
 Behind the Cow
 Apache Rocks the Bottom!
 Hello! (Good to Be Back)
 Suavemente
 One (Always Hardcore)
 Shake That!
 Jigga Jigga!
 Maria (I Like It Loud)
 The Night
 Weekend!
 Nessaja
 The Logical Song
 Aiii Shot the DJ
 Posse (I Need You on the Floor)
 She's the Sun
 I'm Your Pusher
 Fuck the Millennium
 Faster Harder Scooter
 Call Me Mañana
 I Was Made for Lovin' You
 We Are The Greatest
 How Much Is the Fish?
 No Fate
 The Age of Love
 Fire
 Break It Up
 I'm Raving
 Rebel Yell
 Let Me Be Your Valentine
 Back in the UK
 Endless Summer
 Friends
 Move Your Ass!
 Hyper Hyper

The Limited Deluxe Edition also comes with a T-shirt and autograph card (only the first 1000 copies were handwritten, other copies were printed).

20 Years of Hardcore bonus content
CD2

 "The Question Is What Is The Question" (A Little Higher Club Mix)
 "The Question Is What Is The Question" (Alex K Remix)
 "The Question Is What Is The Question" (Flip 'n Fill Remix)
 "The Fish Is Jumping"
 "The Question Is What Is The Question" (Micky Modelle Remix)
 "The Question Is What Is The Question" (Headhunters Mix)
 "Up In Smoke"
 "Jumping All Over The World" (The Jacques Renault Club Mix)
 "Tribal Tango"
 "Jumping All Over The World" (Alex K Remix)
 "Jumping All Over The World" (Fugitive 80s Style Remix)

CD3

 "And No Matches" (Fresh Off The Plane Club Mix)
 "B.O.B."
 "I'm Lonely" (Dressed For Success Club Mix)
 "Way Up North"
 "I'm Lonely" (Styles & Breeze Remix)
 "I'm Lonely" (Flip 'n Fill Remix)
 "I'm Lonely" (Alex K Remix)
 "Jump That Rock (Whatever You Want)" (The Telecaster Club Mix)
 "The Hi Hat Song"
 "Jump That Rock (Whatever You Want)" (Jorg Schmid Remix)

Charts

Weekly charts

Year-end charts

Notes
 "The Definition" takes its 'lyrics' directly from the wikipedia article on jumping, set to the music of Boccherini's Menuet and Trio, from his String Quartet in E. This same piece of music is used on the final track "The Greatest Difficulty".
 "Jumping All Over The World" is based on the song "A Glass Of Champagne" by the pop group Sailor, taken from the 1975 album Trouble. The main melody also resembles that of "Rock Civilization" by Headhunterz.
 "The Question Is What Is The Question?" is based on 2006 song "How Do You Do" by Party Animals, the 2004 song "Frozen Flame" and 2007 song "Freefall" both by Jeckyll & Hyde and samples the song "How Do You Do" by Mouth & MacNeal, taken from the 1972 album of the same name.
 "Enola Gay" takes elements from the song of the same name by Orchestral Manoeuvres in the Dark, taken from the 1980 album Organisation.
 "Neverending Story" samples the theme song from the American version of the 1984 film The NeverEnding Story, composed by Giorgio Moroder and originally sung by Limahl from Kajagoogoo.
 "And No Matches" samples the 1998 song "Big Big World" by Emilia, taken from the 1999 album of the same name, and is based on the 2004 song "Frozen Flame" by Jeckyll & Hide.
 "Cambodia" is based on the song "Vietnam" by Vorwerk, which is itself based on the song "Cambodia" performed by Kim Wilde and written by Marty and Ricky Wilde, taken from the 1982 album Select.
 "I'm Lonely" samples the songs "Lonely" by Felix Project and "A Step Too Far" by Refresh. Single version of the song samples "Fly Away" by Vincent de Moor as well as "Thrill" by Ernesto vs Bastian. Later releases contain only the radio edit. On the "20 Years of Hardcore" re-release, the "Alex K Remix" of the song was shorter than the original release.
 "Whistling Dave" samples the Russian folk song "Korobeiniki", known as the theme music from the video game Tetris, specifically the Nintendo Game Boy version.
 "Marian (Version)" is a cover of the song by The Sisters of Mercy, taken from the 1985 album First and Last and Always.
 "Lighten Up The Sky" samples "Cumulus" by Polish trance project Nitrous Oxide, "Torrent" by Dave 202 and "Everybody" by Rick Tonic (second version only).
 "The Hardcore Massive" samples "FTS" by Showtek.
 "Jump That Rock!" is based on the song "1980 (Marshall Mix)" by Citizen, which is itself based on the 1979 Status Quo song "Whatever You Want" (taken from the album of the same name). It also samples the introduction to "Kick Out the Jams" by MC5 (taken from the 1969 album of the same name), as previously sampled by The KLF on their 1990 single "What Time Is Love? (Live At Trancentral)".
 The Sheffield Jumpers dance troupe were featured in the videos for all five singles from the album, exempting "I'm Lonely". They also accompanied Scooter on the "Jumping All Over The World Tour".

References

External links
 Album info and audio samples from scootertechno.com

2007 albums
Scooter (band) albums